Connecticut shooting may refer to:
 Sandy Hook Elementary School shooting (2012)
 Hartford Distributors shooting (2010)
 Murder of Christian Prince (1991)
 Murder of Alex Rackley (1970)
 Joseph "Mad Dog" Taborsky's crime spree (1950s)